Lighting is the deliberate use of light to achieve a practical or aesthetic effect.

Types of lighting include:

 Christmas lighting
 Automotive lighting
 Emergency vehicle lighting
 Ground effects lighting
 Backlighting
 Bicycle lighting
 Bisexual lighting
 Cameo lighting
 Carbide lighting
 Celebratory lighting
 Computer graphics lighting
 Image-based lighting
 Per-pixel lighting
 Per-vertex lighting
 Unified lighting and shadowing
 Volumetric lighting
 Cove lighting
 Electric lighting
 Emergency lighting
 Excessive lighting (light pollution)
 Fluorescent lighting
 Fusion lighting
 Gas lighting
 Incandescent lighting
 Landscape lighting
 Library lighting
 Mood lighting
 Photographic lighting
 High-key lighting
 Low-key lighting
 Rembrandt lighting
 Runway lighting
 Security lighting
 Solid-state lighting
 Stage lighting
 Intelligent lighting
 LED stage lighting
 Street lighting
 Task lighting
 Track lighting
 Urban lighting

See also
 
 
 Light (disambiguation)
 Lightning (disambiguation)

Lighting